An RSVP is a request for response to an invitation (from the French: répondez s'il vous plaît)

RSVP or R.S.V.P. may also refer to:

Arts, entertainment, and media

Film
 R.S.V.P. (1984 film), an American film
 R.S.V.P. (2002 film), a horror film
 RSVP (1991 film), a short film directed by Laurie Lynd
 RSVP Movies, an Indian film production company

Games
 RSVP (board game), a vertical version of Scrabble

Music 
 R.S.V.P. (Rare Songs, Very Personal), a 2004 album by Nancy Wilson
 "R.S.V.P." (Five Star song), a 1985 single by British pop group Five Star
 "R.S.V.P.", a song by Nesian Mystik from their 2008 album Elevator Musiq
 "R.S.V.P.", a song by Boney James & Rick Braun on the album Shake It Up
 "R.S.V.P.", a song by Pop Will Eat Itself, released as a single in 1993
 "RSVP", a song by Heart from their 1987 album Bad Animals
 "RSVP", a song on the 2011 album 90 Bisodol (Crimond) by Half Man Half Biscuit
 R.S.V.P. (upcoming R&B supergroup), developed after 2022 Verzuz appearance, EP Album and release currently in development.

Enterprises and organizations 
 Red Sandstone Varied Productions, a performance arts company based in Ireland
 Resolve to Stop Violence Project, a program to try to help incarcerated prisoners recognize their violent attitudes and change them
 Retired and Senior Volunteer Program, a volunteerism promotion by Senior Corps
 RSVP Technologies Inc., an artificial intelligence company based in Canada
 RSVP.com.au, an Australian dating site

Science and technology 
 Rapid serial visual presentation, a method for measuring the speed of vision
 Resource Reservation Protocol, a computer network protocol